The Beautiful Summer is a novel by Italian author Cesare Pavese. It was first published in Italian as La bella estate in 1949. It was released in English by Peter Owen in 1955, and rereleased by Penguin European Writers in 2018.

The book is an account of love in 1930s Italy.

References

1949 novels
Italian novels
Novels set in the 1930s